Robert Hamill was a Northern Irish Catholic man who was beaten to death by a loyalist mob in Portadown, County Armagh, Northern Ireland. Hamill and his friends were attacked on 27 April 1997 on the town's main street. It has been claimed that the local Royal Ulster Constabulary (RUC), parked a short distance away, did nothing to stop the attack. At the time of the murder, tension between loyalists (mainly Protestants) and Irish nationalists (mainly Catholics) was high, mostly due to the ongoing Drumcree parade dispute.

Death
Hamill and his friends were attacked by a group of loyalists while walking home from St. Patrick's dance hall at about 1.30 a.m on 27 April 1997. After walking along Market Street from the dance hall, they came to the intersection of Market and Thomas Streets in Portadown, where they were attacked. Hamill and his friend,  Gregory Girvan, were kicked by the crowd while their attackers shouted abuse at them and Robert Hamill was knocked unconscious almost immediately. The assault lasted about ten minutes, leaving both men unconscious. Just before the ambulance arrived, one of the RUC men got out of the Land Rover and told Garvin to put Robert into the recovery position.

Robert Hamill never regained consciousness and died of his injuries eleven days later on 8 May 1997, aged 25. The cause of his death was recorded as "Diffuse Brain Injury associated with Fracture of Skull due to Blows to the Head". Six people were arrested after Robert Hamill's death, but only one was eventually tried for his murder.

Investigation

Trial of Paul Hobson
Paul R. Hobson was charged with murder, but found not guilty, though he was found guilty of unlawful fighting and causing an affray and sentenced to four years' imprisonment. The case under which Hobson was prosecuted is questionable as the main witness, Constable Atkinson of the then RUC, was at one stage a suspect in conspiracy to cause murder in the same case. His solicitor also did not use crucial evidence in the case to cross-examine witnesses. Mr. Justice McCollum said during his verdict that the killing was a sectarian act, with a very large number of loyalists attacking a small number of nationalists, but that he could not decide whether the RUC men had left their Land Rover or not during the attack.

Allegations of police collusion
The RUC have been criticised for initially claiming in press releases that there was a riot between two large groups; then afterwards claiming it was a large group attacking a group of four. Rosemary Nelson was solicitor for the Hamill family until she was assassinated by a loyalist car bomb in Lurgan.

There have been allegations of collusion between the RUC and suspects. A public inquiry is currently being held on the recommendation of Cory Collusion Inquiry.

New charges
In December 2010 it was announced that three people, including a former RUC officer, were to be charged in relation to Robert Hamill's death.

In September 2014 District Judge Peter King, sitting at Craigavon court, ruled that a key witness was entirely unreliable and utterly unconvincing.  The case against the three, ex-policeman Robert Cecil Atkinson, his wife Eleanor Atkinson, and Kenneth Hanvey, was not sufficient to try.

See also
The Troubles in Portadown
Robert Hamill Inquiry

References

1997 murders in the United Kingdom
1997 in Northern Ireland
20th century in County Armagh
Anti-Catholicism in Northern Ireland
April 1997 crimes
April 1997 events in the United Kingdom
Hate crimes
Police misconduct in Northern Ireland
Deaths by person in Northern Ireland
1990s murders in Northern Ireland